Jiangxisuchus is an extinct genus of crocodylian that lived during the Late Cretaceous in what is now China.  It was described in 2019, and was proposed to be a basal member of Crocodyloidea. However, another concurrent 2019 study recovered Jiangxisuchus instead as a basal member of Alligatoroidea, within the newly named clade Orientalosuchina.

References

Crocodilians
Prehistoric pseudosuchian genera